Ab Zalu-ye Kandeh (also Romanized as Āb Zālū-ye Kandeh; also known as Āb Zālū) is a village in Tayebi-ye Garmsiri-ye Shomali Rural District, in the Central District of Landeh County, Kohgiluyeh and Boyer-Ahmad Province, Iran. At the 2006 census, its population was 50, in 8 families.

References 

Populated places in Landeh County